This is a list of Electricity distribution companies by country.

Albania 
 KESH (Albanian Power Corporation)
 OSHEE (Electric Power Distribution Operator)
 OST (Transmission System Operator)

Algeria 
 SDC (Groupe SONELGAZ)

Australia 
 Ausgrid (previously EnergyAustralia)
 AusNet Services (previously SP AusNet)
 Endeavour Energy (previously Integral Energy)
 Energex
 Ergon Energy
 Essential Energy (previously Country Energy)
 Evoenergy (previously ActewAGL)
 Horizon Power
 Jemena
 Power and Water Corporation
 Powercor Australia (includes CitiPower)
 SA Power Networks (previously ETSA Utilities)
 TasNetworks
 United Energy
 Western Power

Bangladesh 
 Ashuganj Power Station Company Limited
 Bangladesh Power Development Board
 Dhaka Electric Supply Company Limited
 Dhaka Power Distribution Company
 Electricity Generation Company of Bangladesh
 Northern Electricity Supply Company Limited
 Power Grid Company of Bangladesh Limited
 Rural Electrification Board of Bangladesh 
 West Zone Power Distribution Company Limited

Barbados 
 Barbados Light and Power Company

Belgium 
 
 Eandis:IMEA
 Eandis:Imewo
 Eandis:Intergem
 Eandis:Iveka
 Eandis:Iverlek
 Eandis:Sibelgas
 Elia
 Gaselwest
 
 Infrax:P.B.E.
 Infrax:IVEG
 Infrax:Infrax-West
 Infrax:Inter-Electra
 
 Ores:IDEG
 Ores:IEH
 Ores:IGH
 Ores:Interest
 Ores:Interlux
 Ores:Intermosane
 Ores:Sedilec
 Ores:Simogel
 RESA
 Sibelga

Brazil 
Enel São Paulo
 Energisa
 EDP Brasil
 Celesc
 Celpe
 Cemig
 CPFL, subsidiary of State Grid Corporation of China
 Coelba
 Copel
 Cosern
 Elektro
 Equatorial Energia
 Light
 RGE

Botswana 

 Botswana Power Corporation

Canada 
 Alectra Utilities
 AltaLink
 ATCO Electric
 ATCO Power
 BC Hydro and Power Authority
 Brookfield Power
 Cornwall Electric
 ENMAX
 EPCOR
 EQUS REA LTD.
 FortisAlberta
 FortisBC
 Hydro One
 Hydro Ottawa
 Hydro-Québec Distribution
 Manicouagan Power Company
 Manitoba Hydro
 Maritime Electric Power Company
 New Brunswick Power
 Newfoundland and Labrador Hydro
 Newfoundland Power
 Northwest Territories Power Corporation
 Nova Scotia Power
 Ontario Power Generation
 Saint John Energy
 SaskPower
 Toronto Hydro
 TransAlta
 TransCanada Corporation
 Yukon Energy Corporation

Additionally, there are dozens of small regional companies, some of which are listed in List of Canadian electric utilities.

China 
 China Southern Power Grid
 State Grid Corporation of China

Colombia 
 ISA INTERCOLOMBIA (Grupo ISA)

Costa Rica 
Instituto Costarricense de Electricidad
 Compañía Nacional de Fuerza y Luz (CNFL)
 Coopeguanacaste
 Coopelesca
 Coopesantos
 Coopealfaroruiz
 Empresa de Servicios Públicos de Heredia (ESPH)
 JASEC

Croatia 
 HEP Operator distribucijskog sustava (HEP ODS)

Cyprus 
 Electricity Authority of Cyprus

Czech Republic 
 CEZ Distribuce
 E.ON Distribuce
 PREdistribuce

Denmark 
 DONG Energy - now Orsted
 Energi & MiljøForum Thy/Mors
 Energi Fyn
 Energi Hurup
 Energi Nord
 EnergiMidt
 Elforsyning Sydvendsyssel
 Helsingør Elforsyning
 Himmerlands Elforsyning
 Korsør Forsyning A/S
 N1
 Natur-Energi
 NRGi
 Nyfors
 SEAS-NVE
 SYD Energi (ESS Energi Danmark)
 Struer Forsyning
 Sydfyns Elforsyning
 TRE-FOR
 Verdo

Egypt 
 Canal Company for Electricity Distribution

Estonia 
 220 Energia
 Alexela Energia
 Baltic Energy Services
 Eesti Energia
 Eesti Gaas
 Elektrum (Latvenergo)
 Elveso
 Energijos tiekimas
 ESRO
 Imatra Elekter (Imatran Seudun Sähkö)
 Inter RAO
 Nordic Power Management
 Sagro Elekter
 Sillamäe SEJ
 Starman
 TS Energia (Port of Tallinn)
 VKG Elektrivõrgud

Finland 
Caruna
Elenia
Forssan Energia
Helen
Kokemäen Sähkö
Köyliön-Säkylän Sähkö
Lankosken Sähkö
Lappeenrannan Energia
Leppäkosken Sähkö
Lammaisten Energia
Paneliankosken Voima
Pohjolan Voima
Sallila Energia
Savon Voima
Tampereen Sähköverkko
Teollisuuden Voima
Vantaan Energia
Vatajankosken Sähkö
Vakka-Suomen Voima

France 
 Enedis, main distribution company in France with 95% of the electricity distribution grid, 100% subsidiary of Électricité de France (EDF)
 Local distribution companies :
  (ES Energies)
  (GEG)
 
 SICAE de l’Aisne
 Régie d’électricité de Roquebillière
 Régie municipale de Tarascon-sur-Ariège
 Régie du Syndicat Electrique Intercommunal du Pays Chartrain (RSEIPC)
 Régie municipale multiservices de la Réole
 SICAP Pithiviers
 Régie communale d’électricité de Saulnes
 Usine d’Électricité de Metz (UEM)
 SICAE de l’Oise
 Vialis Colmar
 Régie d’électricité d’Elbeuf
 Seolis
 Coopérative d’électricité de Villiers-sur-Marne

Germany 
 E.ON
 EnBW
 Entega
 EWR
 RWE
 Stadtwerke Gronau
 Stadtwerke Haiger
 Stadtwerke Mainz
 M-Strom (Stadtwerke München)
 Vattenfall
 Westnetz
 Stromnetz Berlin

 Westnetz GmbH

 Bayernwerk Netz GmbH
 Netze BW GmbH
 Stromnetz Berlin GmbH
 Mitteldeutsche Netzgesellschaft Strom mbH
 EWE NETZ GmbH
 E.DIS Netz GmbH
 Avacon Netz GmbH

 Syna GmbH
 Stromnetz Hamburg GmbH
 Rheinische NETZGesellschaft mbH
 SWM Infrastruktur GmbH & Co. KG
 EAM Netz GmbH
 Schleswig-Holstein Netz AG
 n-ERGIE Netz GmbH
 Westfalen Weser Netz GmbH
 LEW Verteilnetz GmbH
 TEN Thüringer Energienetze GmbH & Co. KG
 NEW Netz GmbH
 e-netz Südhessen GmbH & Co. KG
 NRM Netzdienste Rhein-Main GmbH
 enercity Netzgesellschaft mbH
 ENSO Netz GmbH
 Netzgesellschaft Düsseldorf mbH
 Stuttgart Netze Betrieb GmbH
 Netz Leipzig GmbH
 Dortmunder Netz GmbH
 regionetz GmbH
 wesernetz Bremen GmbH
 Pfalzwerke Netz AG
 DREWAG NETZ GmbH
 Netze Duisburg GmbH
 ED Netze GmbH
 ELE Verteilnetz GmbH
 ENERVIE Vernetzt GmbH
 ovag Netz AG
 Netzgesellschaft Ostwürttemberg DonauRies GmbH
 EWR Netz GmbH
 e-rp GmbH
 Energienetze Mittelrhein GmbH & Co. KG
 Mainzer Netze GmbH
 Stadtwerke Bochum Netz GmbH
 WSW Netz GmbH
 bnNETZE GmbH
 energis-Netzgesellschaft mbH
 SWB Netz GmbH
 LSW Netz GmbH & Co. KG
 Bonn-Netz GmbH
 MVV Netze GmbH
 münsterNetz GmbH
 Stadtwerke Karlsruhe Netzservice GmbH
 SWKiel Netz GmbH
 swa Netze GmbH
 Stadtwerke Wiesbaden Netz GmbH
 WEMAG Netz GmbH
 Netze Mittelbaden GmbH & Co. KG
 OsthessenNetz GmbH
 NGN NETZGESELLSCHAFT NIEDERRHEIN MBH
 Braunschweiger Netz GmbH
 Regensburg Netz GmbH
 Netze Magdeburg GmbH
 Celle-Uelzen Netz GmbH
 Energieversorgung Halle Netz GmbH
 Stadtwerke Ulm/Neu-Ulm Netze GmbH
 Energienetze Offenbach GmbH
 Netz Lübeck GmbH
 Oberhausener Netzgesellschaft mbH
 SWE Netz GmbH
 FairNetz GmbH
 Stadtwerke Rostock Netzgesellschaft mbH
 Mainfranken Netze GmbH
 AVU Netz GmbH
 Städtische Werke Netz + Service GmbH
 AllgäuNetz GmbH & Co. KG
 Netzgesellschaft Potsdam GmbH
 Stadtwerke Saarbrücken Netz AG
 Energie- und Wasserversorgung Hamm GmbH
 TWL Netze GmbH
 Mittelhessen Netz GmbH
 Harz Energie Netz GmbH
 SWO Netz GmbH
 SWS Netze Solingen GmbH
 Stadtwerke Heidelberg Netze GmbH
 Stadtwerke Jena Netze GmbH
 SWP Stadtwerke Pforzheim GmbH & Co. KG
 Stadtwerke Ingolstadt Netze GmbH
 NHF Netzgesellschaft Heilbronn-Franken mbH
 GGEW, Gruppen-Gas- und Elektrizitätswerk Bergstraße AG
 infra fürth gmbh
 Energie Waldeck-Frankenberg GmbH
 Unterfränkische Überlandzentrale eG
 Erlanger Stadtwerke AG
 wesernetz Bremerhaven GmbH
 EWR GmbH
 Albwerk GmbH & Co. KG
 GSW Gemeinschaftsstadtwerke GmbH
 SWT Stadtwerke Trier Versorgungs-GmbH
 EVI Energieversorgung Hildesheim GmbH & Co. KG
 Netzgesellschaft Gütersloh mbH
 Aschaffenburger Versorgungs-GmbH
 SWK Stadtwerke Kaiserslautern Versorgungs-AG
 Netzgesellschaft Schwerin mbH (NGS)
 Hanau Netz GmbH
 GeraNetz GmbH
 SÜC Energie und H2O GmbH
 Überlandwerk Rhön GmbH
 LEITUNGSPARTNER GmbH
 Stadtwerke Konstanz GmbH
 BIGGE ENERGIE GmbH & Co. KG
 Thüga Energienetze GmbH
 Elektroenergieversorgung Cottbus GmbH
 nvb Nordhorner Versorgungsbetriebe GmbH
 Dessauer Stromversorgung GmbH
 Zwickauer Energieversorgung GmbH
 GEW Wilhelmshaven GmbH
 Vereinigte Wertach-Elektrizitätswerke GmbH
 Stadtwerke Troisdorf GmbH
 KEW Kommunale Energie- und Wasserversorgung AG
 TWS Netz GmbH
 Energie- und Wasserversorgung Rheine GmbH
 Bocholter Energie- und Wasserversorgung GmbH
 BEW Netze GmbH
 StWB Stadtwerke Brandenburg an der Havel GmbH & Co. KG
 Stadtwerke Aalen GmbH
 Stadtwerke Schweinfurt GmbH
 Energieversorgung Rüsselsheim GmbH
 Verteilnetz Plauen GmbH
 ENWG Energienetze Weimar GmbH & Co. KG
 Neubrandenburger Stadtwerke GmbH
 Osterholzer Stadtwerke GmbH & Co. KG
 Stadtwerke Rosenheim Netze GmbH
 Hertener Stadtwerke GmbH
 Überlandwerk Leinetal GmbH
 SWS Netze GmbH
 Netzgesellschaft Frankfurt (Oder) mbH
 Regionalwerk Bodensee Netze GmbH & Co. KG
 Vereinigte Stadtwerke Netz GmbH
 Mainnetz GmbH
 GWS Stadtwerke Hameln GmbH
 Stadtwerke Wolfenbüttel GmbH
 EnergieSüdwest Netz GmbH
 Albstadtwerke GmbH
 Netzgesellschaft Ahlen mbH
 Hellenstein-Energie-Logistik GmbH
 KommEnergie GmbH
 enwag energie- und wassergesellschaft mbH
 SVS-Versorgungsbetriebe GmbH
 Stadtwerke Passau GmbH
 Freisinger Stadtwerke Versorgungs-GmbH
 Überlandwerk Erding GmbH & Co. KG
 Elektrizitätswerk Wörth a.d. Donau Rupert Heider & Co. KG
 SWE Netz GmbH (Ettlingen)
 star.Energiewerke GmbH & Co. KG
 Energie- und Wasserversorgung Bruchsal GmbH
 SWF Stadtwerke Fellbach GmbH
 Stromnetz Weiden i.d.Opf. GmbH & Co. KG
 Stadtnetze Neustadt a. Rbge. GmbH & Co. KG
 MEGA Monheimer Elektrizitäts- und Gasversorgung GmbH
 ENRW Energieversorgung Rottweil GmbH & Co. KG
 Strom- und Gasnetz Wismar GmbH
 EVB Netze GmbH
 Nordhausen Netz GmbH
 Alliander Netz Heinsberg GmbH
 Freiberger Stromversorgung GmbH
 Maintal-Werke-GmbH
 Energienetze Bayern GmbH
 FREITALER STROM+GAS GMBH
 Netzgesellschaft Bitterfeld-Wolfen mbH
 Teutoburger Energie Netzwerk eG (TEN eG)
 EGT Energie GmbH
 SWL Verteilungsnetzgesellschaft mbH
 WEV Warendorfer Energieversorgung GmbH
 Stadtwerke Merseburg GmbH
 Energie- und Wasserwerke Bautzen GmbH
 Stadtwerke Zweibrücken GmbH
 Netzwerke Saarlouis GmbH
 Elektrizitätsnetze Allgäu GmbH
 Versorgungsbetriebe Hoyerswerda GmbH
 e.wa riss Netze GmbH
 Rheinhessische Energie- und Wasserversorgungs-GmbH
 Sömmerdaer Energieversorgung GmbH
 Werraenergie GmbH
 SEW Stromversorgungs-GmbH
 NHL Netzgesellschaft Heilbronner Land GmbH & Co. KG
 KWH Netz GmbH
 Stromnetzgesellschaft Herrenberg mbH & Co. KG
 Netzwerke Merzig GmbH
 Stadt- und Überlandwerke GmbH Luckau-Lübbenau
 Energie- und Wasserversorgung Altenburg GmbH
 REDINET Burgenland GmbH
 SWN Stadtwerke Northeim GmbH
 Stadtwerke Ilmenau GmbH
 Meißener Stadtwerke GmbH
 Wirtschaftsbetriebe der Stadt Norden GmbH
 Bad Honnef AG
 Technische Werke Naumburg GmbH
 Stadtwerke Zirndorf GmbH
 Netzgesellschaft Lübbecke mbH
 VersorgungsBetriebe Elbe GmbH
 Stromnetz Kulmbach GmbH & Co. KG
 SSW Netz GmbH
 Kommunale Energienetze Inn-Salzach GmbH & Co. KG
 Kommunale Energieversorgung GmbH Eisenhüttenstadt
 Saalfelder Energienetze GmbH
 Schleswiger Stadtwerke GmbH
 Stadtwerke Staßfurt GmbH
 EGF EnergieGesellschaft Frankenberg mbH
 Herzo Werke GmbH
 Versorgungsbetriebe Hann. Münden GmbH
 Stadtwerke Lutherstadt Eisleben GmbH
 EZV Energie- und Service GmbH & Co. KG Untermain
 Energie Calw GmbH
 Licht-, Kraft- und Wasserwerke Kitzingen GmbH
 ENA Energienetze Apolda GmbH
 EnR Energienetze Rudolstadt GmbH
 Stadtwerk Tauberfranken GmbH
 T.W.O. Technische Werke Osning GmbH
 Stadtwerke Zittau GmbH
 Greizer Energienetze GmbH
 Städtische Betriebswerke Luckenwalde GmbH
 InfraServ GmbH & Co. Wiesbaden KG
 TRIDELTA Energieversorgungs GmbH
 Stromversorgung Neunkirchen GmbH
 Stromnetzgesellschaft Hechingen GmbH & Co. KG
 Energieversorgung Sylt GmbH
 EVE Netz GmbH
 EHINGER ENERGIE GmbH & Co. KG
 SWL-energis Netzgesellschaft mbH & Co. KG
 Stadtwerke Wolfhagen GmbH
 Energieversorgung Alzenau GmbH
 NETZE Bad Langensalza GmbH
 Netzgesellschaft Forst (Lausitz) mbH & Co. KG
 SWV Regional GmbH
 SWW Wunsiedel GmbH
 SVI - Stromversorgung Ismaning GmbH
 ews-Netz GmbH
 Überlandzentrale Wörth/I.-Altheim Netz AG
 Stadtwerke Weißenburg GmbH
 Stadtwerk Haßfurt GmbH
 Stadtwerke Witzenhausen GmbH
 Verteilnetze Energie Weißenhorn GmbH & Co. KG
 Stadtwerke Zeven GmbH
 TWL-Verteilnetz GmbH
 NWW Netzwerke Wadern GmbH
 Städtische Werke Borna Netz GmbH
 SWN Stadtwerke Neustadt GmbH
 NordNetz GmbH
 Blomberger Versorgungsbetriebe GmbH
 StWL Städtische Werke Lauf a.d. Pegnitz GmbH
 Stromversorgung Zerbst GmbH & Co. KG
 eneREGIO GmbH
 SWR Energie GmbH & Co. KG
 Stromversorgung Pfaffenhofen a. d. Ilm GmbH & Co. KG
 NWS Netzwerke Saarwellingen GmbH
 Energie und Wasserversorgung Aktiengesellschaft Kamenz
 EMB Energieversorgung Miltenberg-Bürgstadt GmbH & Co. KG
 Butzbacher Netzbetrieb GmbH & Co. KG
 HEWA GmbH
 Kommunalunternehmen Gemeindewerke Peißenberg
 PVU Energienetze GmbH
 Versorgungsbetriebe Kronshagen GmbH
 Bauer Netz GmbH & Co. KG
 VersorgungsWerke Heddesheim GmbH & Co. KG
 Elektrizitätsgenossenschaft Hasbergen e.G.
 Verbandsgemeindewerke Dahner Felsenland
 Eichsfelder Energie- und Wasserversorgungsgesellschaft mbH
 Netzgesellschaft Eisenberg mbH
 Stadtnetze Barmstedt GmbH
 KEEP - Kommunale Eisenberger Energiepartner GmbH
 Regionalnetze Linzgau GmbH
 SVH Stromversorgung Haar GmbH
 Netzbetrieb Hirschberg GmbH & Co. KG
 Odenwald Netzgesellschaft GmbH & Co. KG
 Energie- und Wasserversorgung Kirchzarten GmbH
 Versorgungsbetriebe Bordesholm GmbH
 Havelstrom Zehdenick GmbH
 Weißachtal-Kraftwerke eG
 Stromversorgung Angermünde GmbH
 SWB Stadtwerke Biedenkopf GmbH
 Feuchter Gemeindewerke GmbH
 Stadtwerke Zwiesel
 Stromversorgung Sulz GmbH
 Städtisches Kommunalunternehmen Baiersdorf
 Überlandwerk Eppler GmbH
 GELSENWASSER Energienetze GmbH
 KEW Karwendel Energie & Wasser GmbH
 Saerbecker Ver- und Entsorgungsnetzgesellschaft mbH
 Verbandsgemeindewerke Enkenbach-Alsenborn
 Energieversorgung A9 Mitte GmbH & Co. KG
 Licht- und Kraftwerke Helmbrechts GmbH
 EWR Netze GmbH
 Versorgungsbetriebe Zellingen
 Kommunalunternehmen Stadtwerke Klingenberg (AöR)
 Stadtwerke Zeil a. Main
 Elektrizitätswerke Schönau Netze GmbH
 Stromversorgung Inzell eG
 Stromversorgung Schierling eG
 Wirtschaftsbetriebe der Stadt NSHB Borkum GmbH
 abita Energie Otterberg GmbH
 Stromversorgung Röttenbach
 Versorgungsbetrieb Waldbüttelbrunn GmbH
 Gammertinger Energie- und Wasserversorgung GmbH
 Cramer-Mühle KG
 Gebrüder Eirich GmbH & Co KG
 Gebrüder Miller GmbH & Co. KG
 EVI Energieversorgung Ihmert GmbH & Co KG
 Raiffeisenbank Greding-Thalmässing eG
 C. Ensinger GmbH & Co. KG
 Westenthanner Energieversorgung GmbH
 Rothmoser GmbH & Co. KG
 Elektrizitätsgenossenschaft Dirmstein eG
 Elektrizitätsgenossenschaft Oesterweg e.G.
 Elektra-Genossenschaft Effeltrich eG
 TauberEnergie Kuhn, Karl und Andreas Kuhn OHG
 Energienetze Berlin GmbH
 Versorgungsbetriebe Röttingen
 GETEC net delta GmbH & Co.KG
 Fürstlich Fugger v. Glött´sche E-Werk GmbH & Co. KG
 Eichenmüller GmbH & Co. KG Energieversorgung + Elektrotechnik
 Markt Thüngen
 Müller - Mühle GmbH & Co. KG
 Hermann Geuder e.K. Elektrizitätswerk
 Stromkontor Netzgesellschaft mbH
 Elektrizitätsgenossenschaft Karlstein eG
 Elektrizitäts- und Wasserversorgungsgenossenschaft Vagen eG
 EVIP GmbH
 Covestro Brunsbüttel Energie GmbH
 Pharmaserv GmbH

Greece 
 HEDNO

Hong Kong 
 CLP
 Hongkong Electric

India 
 Adani Electricity Mumbai Limited
 Ajmer Vidyut Vitran Nigam Ltd
 Andhra Pradesh State Electricity Board (APSEB), Andhra Pradesh
 Southern Power Distribution Company of Andhra Pradesh Limited
 Assam Power Distribution Company Limited (APDCL), Assam
 Bangalore Electricity Supply Company
 Brihanmumbai Electric Supply and Transport
 BSES Rajdhani Power Ltd. Delhi
 BSES Yamuna Power Ltd. Delhi
 Calcutta Electric Supply Corporation
 Chamundeshwari Electricity Supply Corporation Limited
 Dakshin Gujarat Vij Company Ltd. (DGVCL) Surat
 Dakshin Haryana Bijli Vitran Nigam
 Damodar Valley Corporation
 Essel Vidhyut Vitran Ujjain Pvt. Ltd.''
 Goa Electricity Board
 Gulbarga Electricity Supply Company Limited
 Hubli Electricity Supply Company Limited
 India Power Corporation Limited
 Jaipur Vidyut Vitran Nigam Limited
 Jodhpur Vidyut Vitran Nigam Ltd
 Karnataka Power Corporation Limited
 Kerala State Electricity Board
 Madhya Pradesh Paschim Kshetra Vidyut Vitaran Company Ltd.
 Madhya Pradesh Poorv Kshetra Vidyut Vitaran Company Ltd.
 Madhya Pradesh Madhya Kshetra Vidyut Vitaran Company Ltd.
 Madhya Gujarat Vij Company Ltd. (MGVCL) Vadodara
 Maharashtra State Electricity Distribution Company Limited
 Mangalore Electricity Supply Company Limited
 Manipur State Power Distribution Company Limited
 National Thermal Power Corporation
 Neyveli Lignite Corporation
 North Eastern Supply Company of Odisha Ltd
 Noida Power Company Limited
 North Bihar Power Distribution Company Limited
 Paschim Gujarat Vij Company Ltd (PGVCL) Rajkot
 Power Development Department
 PowerGrid Corporation of India
 Punjab State Power Corporation Limited
 Reliance Infrastructure
 South Bihar Power Distribution Company Limited
 Southern Electricity Supply Company of Orissa
 Tamil Nadu Electricity Board
 Tata Power
 Tata Power Delhi Distribution Limited (NDPL), Delhi
 Torrent Power Ltd
 Torrent Power Ltd, Agra
 Torrent Power Ltd, Ahmedabad
 Torrent Power Ltd, Surat
 Tripura State Electricity Corporation Limited (TSECL)
 Uttar Gujarat Vij Company Ltd (UGVCL) Mehsana
 Uttar Haryana Bijli Vitran Nigam Limited
 Uttar Pradesh Power Corporation Limited
 Dakshinanchal Vidyut Vitaran Nigam Limited (DVVNL)[2] - Agra Zone Discom
 Kanpur Electricity Supply Company (KESCO)[6] - Kanpur City Discom
 Lucknow Electricity Supply Administration (LESA) - Lucknow City Discom
 Madhyanchal Vidyut Vitaran Nigam Limited (MVVNL)[3] - Lucknow Zone Discom
 Pashchimanchal Vidyut Vitaran Nigam Limited (PVVNL)[4] - Meerut Zone Discom
 Purvanchal Vidyut Vitaran Nigam Limited (PUVVNL)[5] - Varanasi Zone Discom
 West Bengal State Electricity Board (WBSEDCL)

Indonesia 
 Perusahaan Listrik Negara

Ireland 
 ESB Group

Italy 
 A2A
 Edison S.p.A.
 Enel
 Eni
 Sorgenia
 Terna Group

Iran

Israel 
 Israel Electric Corporation

Japan 
 Chubu Electric Power Company
 Chugoku Electric Power Company
 Hokkaido Electric Power Company
 Hokuriku Electric Power Company
 Kansai Electric Power Company
 Kyushu Electric Power Company
 Okinawa Electric Power Company
 Shikoku Electric Power Company
 Tohoku Electric Power Company
 Tokyo Electric Power Company

Jordan 
 NEPCO
 Jordan Electric Power Company - JEPCO

Kenya 
 Kenya Power and Lighting Company

Latvia 
 Inter RAO
 Latvenergo

Lebanon 
 Electricité Du Liban (EDL)

Lithuania 
 AB ESO

Macau 
 CEM

Madagascar 
 Jirama
 Hydelec Madagascar

Malaysia 
 Tenaga Nasional
 Sarawak Energy
 Sabah Electricity

Mexico 
 Comisión Federal de Electricidad

Namibia 
 Central North Regional Electricity Distributor
 City of Windhoek
 Erongo Red
 NamPower
 Nored Electricity

Nepal 
 Nepal Electricity Authority

Netherlands 
 Coteq Netbeheer
 Enduris
 Enexis
 Liander
 Rendo
 Stedin
 Westland Infra

New Zealand 
 Alpine Energy
 Aurora Energy
 Buller Electricity
 Centralines
 Counties Power
 Eastland Network
 Electra
 Electricity Ashburton
 Electricity Invercargill
 Horizon Energy Distribution
 MainPower
 Marlborough Lines
 Nelson Electricity
 Network Tasman
 Network Waitaki
 Northpower
 Orion
 OtagoNet
 Powerco
 Scanpower
 The Lines Company
 The Power Company
 Top Energy
 Unison Networks
 Vector Limited
 Waipa Networks
 WEL Networks
 Wellington Electricity
 Westpower

Nigeria 
 Abuja Electricity Distribution Company
 Benin Electricity Distribution Company
 Eko Electricity Distribution Company
 Enugu Electricity Distribution Company
 Ibadan Electricity Distribution Company
 Ikeja Electricity Distribution Company
 Jos Electricity Distribution Company
 Kaduna Electricity Distribution Company Plc
 Kano Electricity Distribution Company
 Port Harcourt Electricity Distribution Company
 Yola Electricity Distribution Company

North Macedonia 
 EVN AD Skopje (subsidiary of EVN Group)

Pakistan 
 Arslan Electric Provider (AEP)
 Faisalabad Electric Supply Company
 Gujranwala Electric Power Company
 Hazara Electric Power Company
 Hub Power Company
 Hyderabad Electric Supply Company
 Islamabad Electric Supply Company
 K-Electric
 Kot Addu Power Company
 Lahore Electric Supply Company
 Multan Electric Power Company
 Peshawar Electric Power Company
 Quetta Electric Supply Company
 Sukkur Electric Supply Company
 Tribal Electric Supply Company
 Water and Power Development Authority

Philippines 

 Davao Light and Power Company
 Meralco
 National Power Corporation
 National Grid Corporation of the Philippines
 Visayan Electric Company

Poland 
 Enea Operator Sp. z o.o.
 Energa Operator SA
 PGE Dystrybucja SA
 Polskie Sieci Elektroenergetyczne (PSE)
 RWE Stoen Operator Sp. z o.o.
 Tauron Dystrybucja SA

Portugal 
 Energias de Portugal
 Redes Energéticas Nacionais

Qatar 
 Kahramaa

Romania 
 A ENERGY INDSRL
 ADERRO GP ENERGY
 ALPA WIND SRL
 Alpiq RomIndustries S.R.L.
 ALRO S.A.
 APURON Energy
 AXPO ENERGY ROMANIA SA
 C-Gaz & Energy Distributie SRL
 CAS REGENERABILE SRL
 CEZ Distribuție SA
 CEZ Vanzare
 CIGA ENERGY SA
 CURENT ALTERNATIV SRL
 Electric Planners SRL
 Electrica S.A.
 Electrica Distribuție Muntenia Nord SA 
 Electrica Transilvania Nord SA 
 
 ENOL GRUP SA
 
 
 
 
 ENEL TRADE ROMANIA SRL
 Energy Distribution Services
 ENEX S.R.L.
 ENGIE Romania
 ENTREX SERVICES SRL
 
 E.ON Energie Romania
 EVA ENERGY S.A
 EFT FURNIZARE S.R.L.
 ELECTROMAGNETICA SA
 GDM LOGISTICS
 GETICA 95 COM
 INDUSTRIAL ENERGY S.A.
 Luxten Lighting Company S.A.
 MET ROMANIA ENERGY MARKETING SRL
 Monsson Trading S.R.L.
 NEPTUN S.A.
 NEXT ENERGY PARTNERS S.R.L.
 NOVA POWER & GAS
 PHOTOVOLTAIC GREEN PROJECT S.R.L.
 POWER CLOUDS S.R.L.
 RCS &RDS SA
 RENOVATIO TRADING SRL
 RESTART ENERGY ONE SRL
 ROMELECTRO SA
 RWE energie electrică
 S.C. ENERGY NETWORK S.R.L.
 S.C. MIDAS&CO SRL
 S.C. Vienna Energy Forta Naturala S.R.L
 SC ALIVE CAPITAL SRL
 SC Fidelis Energy Srl
 SC ELECTRICOM SA
 SC ELECTRIFICARE CFR SA
 SC NEXT POWER SRL
 SC STOCK ENERGY SRL
 Tinmar Energy
 TRANSENERGO COM S.A.
 WERK ENERGY SRL
VENTUS RENEW ROMANIA SRL

Russia
 Rosseti
 RusHydro
 Inter RAO
 IDGC of the Urals
 IDGC of Siberia
 IDGC of Center and Volga Region
 IDGC of Volga
 IDGC of South
 IDGC of the North Caucasus
 Kubanenergo
 Lenenergo
 Moscow United Electric Grid Company
 Tyumenenergo
 Yantarenergo

Serbia 
Elektroprivreda Srbije
ENEKOD
Restart Energy DOO

Singapore 
 Singapore Power

Slovenia 
Elektro Celje
Elektro Gorenjska
Elektro Ljubljana
Elektro Maribor
Elektro Primorska
GEN-I

South Africa 
 Eskom

South Korea 
 Korea Electric Power Corporation

Spain 
 Red Eléctrica de España

Sri Lanka 
 Ceylon Electricity Board

Sweden 
 E.ON
 Ellevio
 Götene Elförening ek. för.
 Gislaved Energi AB
 Öresundskraft
 Sala-Heby Energi Elnät AB
 Smedjebacken Energi Nät AB
 Sollentuna Energi AB
 Varabygdens Energi ek. för.
 Vattenfall

Switzerland 
 BKW
 Groupe E

Taiwan 
 Taiwan Power Company

Tanzania
 TANESCO-TZ does not allow any other firm to provide electricity

Thailand 
 Electricity Generating Authority of Thailand
 Metropolitan Electricity Authority
 Provincial Electricity Authority

Turkey 
 Akdeniz Electricity Distribution Company
 Akedaş Electricity Distribution Corp.
 Aras Electricity Distribution Company
 Aydem Electricity Distribution Corp.
 Boğaziçi Electricity Distribution Company
 Çalık Yeşilırmak Electricity Distribution Company
 Çamlıbel Electricity Distribution Corp.
 Çoruh Electricity Distribution Company
 Dicle Electricity Distribution Company
 Enerjisa Başkent Electricity Distribution Company
 Fırat Electricity Distribution Company
 Gediz Electricity Distribution Company
 İstanbul Anadolu Yakası Electricity Distribution Company
 Kayseri ve Civarı Electricity Distribution Turk Corp.
 Meram Electricity Distribution Company
 Osmangazi Electricity Distribution Company
 Sakarya Electricity Distribution Company
 Trakya Electricity Distribution Company
 Toroslar Electricity Distribution Company
 Turkish Electricity Distribution Corporation
 Uludağ Electricity Distribution Company
 Yeşilırmak Electricity Distribution Company
 Van Gölü Electricity Distribution Company

United Arab Emirates
 Abu Dhabi - Abu Dhabi Distribution Company (ADDC) and Al Ain Distribution Company (AADC)
 Dubai - Dubai Electricity & Water Authority (DEWA)
 Sharjah - Sharjah Electricity & Water Authority (SEWA)
 Rest of UAE - Federal Electricity & Water Authority (FEWA)

United Kingdom

There are 15 distribution network operator (DNO) regions. Fourteen different district networks are managed by six operators across England, Scotland and Wales, whilst one operator controls the distribution network in Northern Ireland.

England

 Electricity North West (previously NORWEB)
 Northern Powergrid (Northern Electric & Yorkshire Electricity)
 Scottish and Southern Electricity Networks (previously Scottish Hydro-Electric)
 Scottish Power (SP Manweb)
 UK Power Networks (LPN-EPN & SPN)
 National Grid (Great Britain) (Western Power Distribution, Central Networks and SWEB)

Scotland

 Scottish and Southern Electricity Networks (previously Scottish Hydro-Electric)
 Scottish Power

Wales

 Scottish Power (SP Manweb)
 National Grid (Great Britain) (Western Power Distribution, Infralec and South Wales Electricity)

Northern Ireland

 ESB Group (Northern Ireland Electricity)

United States

Alabama - Alabama Power, a part of the Southern Company, PowerSouth Energy Cooperative, Inc., Wiregrass Electric Cooperative, Tennessee Valley Authority
Alaska - Golden Valley Electric Association, Chugach Electric Association, Copper Valley Electric Association, Municipal Light & Power, Kodiak Electric Association
Arizona - Arizona Public Service, Salt River Project, Tucson Electric Power
Arkansas - Entergy
California - Azusa Light & Water, East Bay Municipal Utility District, Glendale Public Service Department, Gridley Municipal Utilities, Healdsburg Municipal Electric Department, Los Angeles Department of Water and Power, Merced Irrigation District, Modesto Irrigiation District, Nevada Irrigation District, Placer County Water Agency, Pacific Gas & Electric, Pacific Power, Riverside Public Utilities, Sacramento Municipal Utility District, Santa Clara Electric Department, San Diego Gas & Electric, Sierra-Pacific Power, Southern California Edison, Southern California Public Power Authority, Turlock Irrigation District, California Department of Water Resources, U.S. Bureau of Reclamation, Pasadena Water & Power, Burbank Water & Power, Anaheim Public Utilities
Colorado - Xcel Energy
Connecticut - Northeast Utilities (including Connecticut Light & Power), United Illuminating, Connecticut Natural Gas, Discount Power
Delaware - Delmarva Power and Light (a subsidiary of Exelon)
District of Columbia - PEPCO
Florida - Florida Power & Light, TECO, Progress Energy Florida, Lake Worth Utilities, JEA (formerly Jacksonville Electric Authority), Gulf Power Company, a part of the Southern Company, Kissimmee Utility Authority, Ocala Electric, Florida Public Utility Company Palm Beach, Florida Municipal Power Agency, LCEC
Georgia - Georgia Power, a part of the Southern Company, Flint Energies, Tennessee Valley Authority
Hawaii - Hawaiian Electric Industries (HECO)
Idaho - IDACORP, PacifiCorp (Rocky Mountain Power)
Illinois - ComEd, Ameren
Indiana - AES Indiana, Duke Energy, Northern Indiana Public Service Company, American Electric Power
Iowa - MidAmerican Energy
Kansas - Kansas City Power & Light, Westar Energy, Kansas City Board of Public Utilities
Kentucky - Kentucky Utilities, Louisville Gas & Electric, Duke Energy, American Electric PowerOwensboro Municipal Utilities
Louisiana - SWEPCO (a subsidiary of American Electric Power), Entergy, CLECO
Maine - Central Maine Power, Bangor Hydro Electric
Maryland - Allegheny Power, Baltimore Gas & Electric, Choptank Electric Cooperative, Delmarva Power, PEPCO, Southern Maryland Electric Cooperative,
Massachusetts - Massachusetts Municipal Wholesale Electric Company (MMWEC), NSTAR, Northeast Utilities (including Western Massachusetts Electric, Berkshire Company/WMECO), National Grid (including Nantucket Electric and Massachusetts Electric), Peabody Municipal Light Plant
Michigan - Consumers Energy, DTE Energy/(Detroit Edison), We Energies, American Electric Power, Wyandotte Municipal Services City of Wyandotte only, Holland Board of Public Works, Lansing Board of Water & Light
Mississippi - Entergy, Southwest Mississippi Electric Power Association, Magnolia Electric, Mississippi Power company, a part of the Southern Company, Tennessee Valley Authority
Minnesota - Xcel Energy, Great River Energy (and its 28-member cooperatives), Minnkota Power Cooperative (and its 11-member cooperatives), Basin Electric Power Cooperative, Dairyland Power Co-op, East River Electric Power Co-op, Hutchinson Utilities Commission, Interstate Power and Light Company, L&O Power Co-op, Marshall Municipal Utilities, Minnesota Power, Minnetonka Power Co-op, Missouri River Energy, Otter Tail Power Company, Rochester Public Utilities Commission, Southern Minnesota Municipal Power Agency, Willmar Municipal Utilities, Freeborn-Mower Co-op Services, People’s Co-op, Tri-County Electric
Missouri - Ameren, Kansas City Power & Light, Empire District Electric, Aquila, City Utilities of Springfield, Independence Power and Light
Montana - Central Montana Electric Power Cooperative, MDU, Montana Electric Cooperatives' Association (and its 25-member cooperatives), NorthWestern Energy
Nebraska - Omaha Public Power District, Nebraska Public Power District
Nevada - Nevada Power, Sierra Pacific Power
New Hampshire - Northeast Utilities (including Public Service of NH), National Grid (including Granite State Electric)
New Jersey - Atlantic City Electric (A subsidiary of Exelon), Public Service Electric and Gas Company (PSE&G), Northeast Utilities, FirstEnergy, Jersey Central Power and Light Company (A subsidiary of GPU Energy, which is a subsidiary of GPU; all of which is now part of FirstEnergy), Vineland Municipal Electric Utility(the only municipal-owned utility in New Jersey), Sussex Rural Electric Cooperative (the only Electric Utility Cooperative in New Jersey)
New Mexico - Public Service Company of New Mexico
New York - CH Energy Group (formerly Central Hudson Gas & Electric), Consolidated Edison Company of New York (Con Edison), Long Island Power Authority (LIPA), Northeast Utilities, National Grid (including Niagara Mohawk), New York State Electric & Gas (NYSEG), Rochester Gas & Electric
North Carolina - Progress Energy Carolinas, Duke Energy, ElectriCities, North Carolina Electric Membership Corp.
North Dakota - Xcel Energy, Otter Tail Power Company, MDU, Central Power Electric Cooperative, Minnkota Power Cooperative, Basin Electric Power Cooperative, Upper Missouri G&T Cooperative
Ohio - Duke Energy, FirstEnergy (Cleveland Electric Illuminating Company, Ohio Edison, Toledo Edison), AEP Ohio, Dayton Power & Light, South Central Power Company, Consolidated Electric Cooperative
Oklahoma - Oklahoma Gas & Electric, Public Service Company of Oklahoma (part of American Electric Power)
Oregon - Columbia River Public Utility District, Eugene Water & Electric Board, PacifiCorp (Pacific Power), Portland General Electric, West Oregon Electric Cooperative
Pennsylvania - Northeast Utilities, Rural valley electric Co. FirstEnergy (Penn Power, Met-Ed, Penelec), PECO, Allegheny Power, PPL, Duquesne Light, Citizens Electric of Lewisburg, Pike County Light & Power Company, UGI Utilities, Inc. and Wellsboro Electric Company
Puerto Rico - Autoridad de Energía Eléctrica, EcoEléctrica
Rhode Island - Northeast Utilities, National Grid (including Narragansett Electric)
South Carolina - Santee Cooper, Duke Energy, Central Electric Power Cooperative, Inc., Progress Energy Carolinas, South Carolina Electric & Gas Company
South Dakota - Xcel Energy, Otter Tail Power Company, Northwestern Energy, Black Hills Power, East River Electric Cooperative, Rushmore Electric Cooperative
Tennessee - Citizens Utilities Board, Electric Power Board, Knoxville Utilities Board, Kingsport Power (Appalachian Power), Lenoir City Utilities Board, Memphis Light, Gas and Water, Nashville Electric Service, Tennessee Valley Authority
Texas - AEP Texas, Austin Energy, CPS Energy, dPi Energy, Electric Database Publishing, Entergy, Garland Power and Light, Lower Colorado River Authority, Reliant Energy, CenterPoint Energy, Texas Electric Service Company, TXU Energy,
Utah - Intermountain Power Agency, PacifiCorp (Rocky Mountain Power)
Vermont - Central Vermont Public Service, Green Mountain Power
Virginia - Allegheny Power, Appalachian Power, Dominion Energy, Rappahannock Electric Cooperative
Washington - PacifiCorp (Pacific Power), Puget Sound Energy, Seattle City Light, Snohomish County Public Utility District (PUD), Mason County Public Utility District 3, Klickitat Public Utility District, Cowlitz County PUD, Clark County PUD, Asotin County PUD, Benton County PUD, Chelan County PUD, Clallam County PUD, Douglas County PUD, Ferry County PUD, Franklin County PUD, Grant County PUD, Grays Harbor County PUD, Jefferson County PUD, Kitsap County PUD, Kittitas County PUD, Lewis County PUD, Okanogan County PUD, Pacific County PUD, Pend Oreille County PUD, Skagit County PUD, Skamania County PUD, Stevens County PUD, Thurston County PUD, Wahkiakum County PUD, Whatcom County PUD
West Virginia - Allegheny Power, Appalachian Power, Wheeling Electric Power (AEP Ohio)
Wisconsin - We Energies, Wisconsin Public Service Corp., Xcel Energy, Madison Gas and Electric, Wisconsin Power & Light
Wyoming - PacifiCorp (Rocky Mountain Power), Lower Valley Energy

Uruguay
UTE

Venezuela 
 Corpoelec

Vietnam 
 Vietnam Electricity (EVN)

References

Electric power distribution network operators
Distribution by country
Lists by country
Lists of energy companies